Ambinanidilana is a rural commune located in Atsinanana on the east coast of Madagascar.

References

Populated places in Atsinanana